The Air Defence Troops are an Arm of the Russian Ground Forces, intended to cover troops and facilities from means of air attack of the enemy during conduct by combined-arms associations and formations of operations (combat actions), regroupings (marches) and being on-site. They are assigned to fulfil the following main tasks:
 combat duty on air defence;
 reconnaissance of enemy aircraft and warning the troops covered;
 destruction of enemy air attack means during their flight;
 participation in conduct of missile defence in theatres of military actions.

Organisationally the Air Defence Troops of the GF consist of military control bodies, AD command points, anti-aircraft missile (rocket-artillery) and radio-technical formations, military units and subdivisions. They are capable of destroying enemy means of air attack throughout the range of heights (extremely small – up to 200 m, small – from 200 to 1000 m, average – from 1000 to 4000 m, large – from 4000 to 12000 m, and in the stratosphere – more than 12000 m) and flight speeds.

Formations, military units and subdivisions of the Air Defence Troops of the GF are equipped with anti-aircraft missiles, anti-aircraft artillery, anti-aircraft gun-and-missile systems and portable anti-aircraft missile systems different on the reach-ability, channel-ability and means of missile guidance. Depending on the range of destruction of aerial targets, they are divided into the systems of near range – up to 10 km, of short range – up to 30 km, of medium range – up to 100 km, of long range – of more than 100 km.

Further development of the Air Defence Troops of the GF is carried out by improving mobility, survivability, covertness of operation, automation’s degree, fire efficiency, expanding parameters of the affected area, reducing the response time and the mass-dimensional characteristics of the guided missile (rocket-artillery) systems.

References

External links

Russian Ground Forces
Military of Russia